Velser Basketballclub Akrides or simply Akrides is a professional basketball club based in IJmuiden, Netherlands.

History
Akrides was founded on October 5, 1961 by Joop Roosenstein. In 1987, the first men's team under the name ESTS Akrides promoted to the Eredivisie, where it remained two seasons. In 1990 Akrides again played in the premier league, then under the name Bestmate Akrides and coming from Haarlem. After three years, the team was moved back to IJmuiden. After the season 1996/1997 Akrides relegated again.

Highlights in the history of Akrides are the winning of the Dutch Cup in 1990 and 1991. The next two years Bestmate Akrides participated in 1990–91 FIBA European Cup Winners' Cup and 1991–92 FIBA European Cup but eliminated by Uppsala (first round, 75–95 defeat away, 94–80 win in home) the first time and by Sunair Oostende (second round, home win 68–63, 66–88 away defeat).

Name through history
 Akrides (1961–1987)
 ESTS Akrides (1987–1990)
 Bestmade Akrides (1990–1992)
 Akrides (1992–1994)
 Big Boss Akrides (1994–1997)
 Akrides (1997–present)

Honours & achievements
Dutch Cup
 Winners (2): 1989–90, 1990–91

European record

Notes

References

External links
 Official site

Basketball teams established in 1961
Basketball teams in the Netherlands
Akrides
Sports clubs in North Holland